Shahi Rural District is a rural district (dehestan) in Sardasht District, Dezful County, Khuzestan Province, Iran, compsn In a 2006 census, its population was 3,370, in 637 families.  The rural district has 47 villages.

References 

Rural Districts of Khuzestan Province
Dezful County